Gareth Steven Parkin (born 5 October 1982) is an English cricketer.  Parkin is a right-handed batsman who bowls right-arm medium-fast.  He was born in Leicester, Leicestershire.

Parkin represented the Leicestershire Cricket Board in a single List A match against Denmark in the 1st round of the 2003 Cheltenham & Gloucester Trophy which was held in 2002.  In his only List A match he took a single wicket at a cost of 62 runs.

References

External links
Gareth Parkin at Cricinfo
Gareth Parkin at CricketArchive

1982 births
Living people
Cricketers from Leicester
English cricketers
Leicestershire Cricket Board cricketers